Diane Savereide (born November 25, 1954) is an American chess player. She received the FIDE title of Woman International Master (WIM) in 1978 and is a five-time winner of the U.S. Women's Chess Championship (1975, 1976, 1978, 1981, 1984).

Biography
From the 1970s to the 1980s, Diane Savereide was one of the leading chess players in the United States. She is only the second American woman to achieve the National Master title (Gisela Kahn Gresser being the first). Diane Savereide won the Marshall Chess Club Women's Invitational in 1976 and 1977. She won the United States Women's Chess Championships five times, in 1975, 1976, 1978 (with Rachel Crotto), 1981 and 1984. In 1978, Diane Savereide was awarded the FIDE Woman International Master (WIM) title.

Diane Savereide played for United States in the Women's Chess Olympiads: six times:
 In 1976, on first board in the 7th Chess Olympiad (women) in Haifa (+4, =3, -3),
 In 1978, on first board in the 8th Chess Olympiad (women) in Buenos Aires (+6, =1, -4),
 In 1980, on first board in the 9th Chess Olympiad (women) in Valletta (+4, =3, -5),
 In 1982, on first board in the 10th Chess Olympiad (women) in Lucerne (+4, =4, -4),
 In 1984, on first board in the 26th Chess Olympiad (women) in Thessaloniki (+5, =4, -4),
 In 1988, on second board in the 28th Chess Olympiad (women) in Thessaloniki (+5, =4, -4).

Diane Savereide participated in the Women's World Chess Championship Interzonal Tournaments four times:
 In 1976, at the Interzonal Tournament in Tbilisi, finishing in 10th place;
 In 1979, at the Interzonal Tournament in Alicante, finishing in 5th place;
 In 1982, at the Interzonal Tournament in Tbilisi, finishing in shared 13th-14th place;
 In 1985, at the Interzonal Tournament in Havana, finishing in 10th place.

She married New Zealand chess player Philip Alan Clemance, but they later divorced. From 1989 Diane Savereide gave up chess and worked as a computer programmer with NASA and then as a software developer in Los Angeles. Diane Savereide was inducted into the U.S. Chess Hall of Fame in 2010.

References

External links
 
 
 

1954 births
Living people
American female chess players
Chess Woman International Masters
Chess Olympiad competitors
21st-century American women
Sportspeople from Albuquerque, New Mexico